John Sanderson may refer to, alphabetically:

John Sanderson (born 1940), a former Governor of Western Australia and a former Chief of the Australian Army
John Sanderson (1560-1627), Levant Company clerk who recorded his life's events, partly published in 1931 as The Travels of John Sanderson in the Levant 1584-1602
John Sanderson (baseball) (1927–2008), American baseball player
John Sanderson (cricketer) (born 1954), English cricketer
John Sanderson (footballer) (1919–?), former English footballer

John Sanderson (photographer) (born 1983), American photographer and artist
John Sanderson (priest) (died 1602), English Roman Catholic priest, known as a writer on logic
John A. Sanderson, president of the Optical Society of America
John P. Sanderson (1818–1864), soldier, politician, lawyer, and newspaper editor in Pennsylvania
John Pease Sanderson (1816–1871), Florida member of the Congress of the Confederate States during the American Civil War
John Tesshin Sanderson, Buddhist

See also
John Burdon-Sanderson (1828–1905), English physiologist